Mendon Cobblestone Academy is a historic school located at Mendon in Monroe County, New York. It is a Federal style cobblestone structure built about 1835. It is constructed of medium-sized field cobbles and is one of only 10 surviving cobblestone buildings in Mendon.  The building was used as a school for about a century.  It was acquired in 1950 by the Mendon Fire Department and remodelled for use as a firehouse.

It was listed on the National Register of Historic Places in 1996.

References

School buildings on the National Register of Historic Places in New York (state)
Cobblestone architecture
Federal architecture in New York (state)
School buildings completed in 1835
Buildings and structures in Monroe County, New York
National Register of Historic Places in Monroe County, New York